María Inés Falconi (born 1954 in Buenos Aires) is an Argentine writer and theatre director for children and young adults.

Writing 
She works in Theatre Expression Ateliers for children and teenagers in the Escuela de Teatro de la Universidad Popular de Belgrane. She's coordinator and director of the Atelier La Mancha. She has given conferences for the Children's Theatre in the Universidad Popular de Belgrano, the Universidad Central de Caracas, the Universidad de Maracaibo and in more institutions in South America.

Works 
Falconi has written numerous books including:
 Niños, las brujas no existen (Kids, Witches do not Exist)
 Pajaritos en bandadas (Little Birds in Flocks)
 Caídos del mapa (Fallen from the Map)
 Hasta el domingo (See You on Sunday)

References

External links
 Review of Las vacaciones para Julia (2000), Escuela Martin Buber - in Spanish
 Bio details on publisher's website - in Spanish

Argentine children's writers
Argentine women children's writers
1954 births
Living people
People from Buenos Aires
Women theatre directors
Argentine women writers